The long-tailed wren-babbler has been split into the following species:
 Naga wren-babbler, Spelaeornis chocolatinus
 Pale-throated wren-babbler, Spelaeornis kinneari
 Chin Hills wren-babbler, Spelaeornis oatesi
 Grey-bellied wren-babbler, Spelaeornis reptatus

Bird common names
Spelaeornis